Resilience, resilient, resiliency, or variation, may refer to:

Science

Ecology
 Ecological resilience, the capacity of an ecosystem to recover from perturbations
 Climate resilience, the ability of systems to recover from climate change
 Soil resilience, the ability of a soil to maintain a healthy state in response to destabilising influences

Social sciences
 Resilience in art, the property of artwork to remain relevant over changing times
 Resilience (organizational), the ability of a system to withstand changes in its environment and still function
 Psychological resilience, an individual's ability to adapt in the face of adverse conditions
 Supply chain resilience, the capacity of a supply chain to persist, adapt, or transform in the face of change
 Urban resilience, the adaptive capacities of complex urban systems to manage change, order and disorder over time
 Community resilience, the adaptive capacities of communities and societies to manage change and adversities over time

Technology and engineering
 Resilience (engineering and construction), the ability of buildings and infrastructure to absorb assaults without suffering complete failure
 Resilience (materials science), the ability of a material to absorb energy when deformed, and release that energy upon unloading
 Resilience (network), the ability of a computer network to maintain service in the face of faults
 Resilience in the built environment
 Cyber resilience, in information security
 Resilient control systems, the engendering of cognitive, cyber-physical threat resilience into control systems
 a concept in energy development

Entertainment and media
 Resilience (film) (2006)
 Resilience (play) (2009)
 Resilience (sculpture), a sculpture in Brisbane, Queensland, Australia

Literature
 Resilience (Greitens book), "Resilience: Hard-Won Wisdom for Living a Better Life", a 2015 book by Eric Greitens
 Resilience (2018), seventh book in Fletcher DeLancey's Chronicles of Alsea series
 Resilience: Two Sisters and a Story of Mental Illness, a memoir by Jessie Close with Pete Earley
 Resilience: Reflections on the Burdens and Gifts of Facing Life's Adversities, a 2009 book by Elizabeth Edwards
 Resilient (book), 2016 autobiography by Australian cricketer Mitchell Johnson

Music

Songs
 "Resilient" (2013), by Running Wild, off the eponymous album Resilient (album)
 "Resilient" (2020), by Katy Perry, off the album Smile (Katy Perry album)
 "Resilience" (2008), by Annabelle Chvostek, off the eponymous album Resilience (Annabelle Chvostek album)

Albums
 Resilient (Dope Saint Jude album) (2018) by Dope Saint Jude
 Resilient (album) (2013) by Running Wild
 The Resilient (2017), album by Betraying the Martyrs
 Resilience (Annabelle Chvostek album) (2008)
 Resilience (Drowning Pool album) (2013)
 Resilience (Kid606 album) (2005)

Other uses
 Crew Dragon Resilience, a SpaceX Dragon 2 space capsule, C207, first used for the second crewed Dragon flight, NASA SpaceX Crew-1, first full-up crew mission to the ISS on the platform
 Resilience NSW, a government agency of the New South Wales government in Australia
 Resilience.org, a pro-environment website owned by the think tank Post Carbon Institute
 UK Resilience, a government agency of the United Kingdom

See also

 The Resilience Project, a project to identify protective factors against disease
 Resilience Alliance, a network that analyzes social interactions
 
 
 
 
 
 

Science disambiguation pages
Social science disambiguation pages
Technology and engineering disambiguation pages